William Leake father (died 1633) and son (died 1681) were London publishers and booksellers.

William Leake may also refer to:
 William Leake (rugby union) (1865–1942), England international rugby union player
 William Martin Leake (1777–1860), British antiquarian and topographer
 William Leake (died 1852) ( – 1852), MP for Mitchell 1818–1820 and 1826–1830,  and Malmesbury 1820–26
 William H. Leake (died 1892), American actor, died in Australia
 William J. Leake (1843–1908), Virginia lawyer, judge and railroad president
 William Walter Leake (1833–1912), officer in the Confederate States Army in the American Civil War
 William Leake (cricketer) (1831–1918), English civil engineer, tea planter and cricketer

See also
 Billy Leake, rugby league  and  who played for Bradford Northern in the 1940s